Minimum wage law is the body of law which prohibits employers from hiring employees or workers for less than a given hourly, daily or monthly minimum wage. More than 90% of all countries have some kind of minimum wage legislation.

History 
Until recently, minimum wage laws were usually very tightly focused.  In the US and Great Britain, for example, they applied only to women and children.  Only after the Great Depression did many industrialized economies extend them to the general work force.  Even then, the laws were often specific to certain industries.  In France, for example, they were extensions of existing trade union legislation.  In the US, industry specific wage restrictions were held to be unconstitutional. The country's Fair Labor Standards Act of 1938 established a uniform national minimum wage for nonfarm, nonsupervisory workers.  Coverage was later extended to most of the labor force.

 In 1894, New Zealand established such arbitration boards with the Industrial Conciliation and Arbitration Act
 In 1896, the colony of Victoria, Australia established similar boards
 In 1907, the Harvester decision was handed down in Australia. It established a 'living wage' for a man, his wife and two children to "live in frugal comfort"
 In 1909, the Trade Boards Act was enacted in the United Kingdom, establishing four such boards
 In 1912, the state of Massachusetts, United States, set minimum wages for women and children
In the United States, statutory minimum wages were first introduced nationally in 1938
 In the 1960s, minimum wage laws were introduced into Latin America as part of the Alliance for Progress; however these minimum wages were, and are, low

Minimum wage law by country

Australia
The Australian National Minimum Wage is the minimum base rate of pay for ordinary hours worked to any employee who is not covered by a Modern Award or an Agreement. In 1896 in Victoria, Australia, an amendment to the Factories Act provided for the creation of a wages board.  The wages board did not set a universal minimum wage; rather it set basic wages for 6 industries that were considered to pay low wages.  First enacted as a four-year experiment, the wages board was renewed in 1900 and made permanent in 1904; by that time it covered 150 different industries.  By 1902, other Australian states, such as New South Wales and Western Australia, had also formed wages boards. The notion of a "basic wage" was established in 1907 with the Harvester Judgment. In Australia, on 14 December 2005, the Australian Fair Pay Commission was established under the Workplace Relations Amendment (WorkChoices) Act 2005 responsible for the adjustment of the standard federal minimum wage, replacing the role of the Australian Industrial Relations Commission that took submissions from a variety of sources to determine appropriate minimum wages. The Australian Fair Pay Commission was replaced by Fair Work Australia in 2010.

Australian historical rates

Australian Fair Work Ombudsman, Minimum Wages Fact Sheet

Brazil
Since Plano Real, the Brazilian national minimum wage is adjusted annually. Historical data and a rough approximation to US Dollars can be seen in the table below.

In Brazil each increase the minimum wage results in a significant burden on the federal budget, because the minimum wage is tied to social security benefits and other government programs and salaries.

Canada

Under the Canadian Constitution's federal-provincial division of powers, the responsibility for enacting and enforcing labour laws rests with the ten provinces; the three territories also were granted this power by virtue of federal legislation. This means that each province and territory has its own minimum wage. Some provinces allow lower wages to be paid to liquor servers and other tip earners, and/or to inexperienced employees.

The federal government could theoretically set its own minimum wage rates for workers in federal jurisdiction industries (interprovincial railways, for example). As of 2006 however, the federal minimum wage is defined to be the general adult minimum wage rate of the province or territory where the work is performed. This means, for example, that an interprovincial railway company could not legally pay a worker in British Columbia less than $10.45 an hour regardless of the worker's experience.

People's Republic of China

The Ministry of Human Resources and Social Security set the People's Republic of China's first minimum wage law on 1 March 2004. The Regulations on Enterprises Minimum Wage was made to "ensure the basic needs of the worker and his family, to help improve workers' performance and to promote fair competition between enterprises." One monthly minimum wage was set for full-time workers, and one hourly minimum wage for part-time workers. Provinces, municipalities, and autonomous regions are allowed to legislate for their own minimum wage separate from the national one.

A law approved February 2013 mandates a nationwide minimum wage at 40% average urban salaries to be phased in fully by 2015. See List of minimum wages in China (PRC) for a list of the latest minimum monthly wages for various provinces or municipalities in China.

European Union

In the European Union 18 out of 27 member states currently have national minimum wages. Many countries, such as Sweden, Finland, Denmark, Austria, Italy, and Cyprus have no minimum wage laws but rely on employer groups and trade unions to set minimum earnings through collective bargaining.

France
The first nationwide minimum wage in France was introduced via the Interprofessional Guaranteed Minimum Wage (SMIG – Salaire minimum interprofessionnel garanti) law, passed in 1950 and accompanied by a High Commission for Collective Agreements (to set the wages based on average cost of living) and a companion law known as "SMAG" for rural/agricultural occupations. The SMIG, which established one baseline hourly wage rate for the Paris region and one for the rest of the country, was indexed to price inflation but rose more slowly than average wages. It was replaced by (SMIC – salaire minimum de croissance) in 1970, which remains the basis of the modern minimum wage law in France.

The national minimum wage (SMIC) in France is updated by the government every year in January. By law, the increase cannot be lower than the inflation rate for the previous year. In recent years, the increase was up to two times higher than inflation (around 5%, with inflation around 2%).

In 2004, 15% of the working population received the minimum wage. In July 2006, the minimum wage in France was set at €8.27 per hour. In July 2008 it was set at €8.71 per hour. An increase of 1.3% on 1 July 2009 brought the hourly rate to €8.82. In 2010, the minimum wage was increased by 0.5% to €8.86 per hour.

Germany

Germany's national minimum wage law (MiLoG – Mindestlohngesetz) came into force on 1 January 2015, introducing Germany's first nationwide legal minimum wage  to the amount of €8.50 per hour.  The German minimum wage level will be updated every other year by a minimum wage commission and acceptance by the government. Since a legal minimum wage law is a derogation of the constitutional right of a collective tariff autonomy, it is discussed whether and to what extent the minimum wage is consistent with the constitution.

Hong Kong

The Legislative Council of Hong Kong (LegCo) passed the Minimum Wage Bill in 2010, requiring the Chief Executive to propose a minimum wage. Through a Provisional Minimum Wage Commission appointed by the government, a HK$28 hourly wage floor was introduced and eventually accepted by the LegCo after much debate. Prior to this, a monthly minimum wage of HK$3,580 for foreign domestic helpers had already been set. In some trades, such as bar-bending and bamboo scaffolding workers in the construction industry, have daily minimum wage negotiated between the trade unions and employers' organisations. As of September 2018, the statutory minimum wage is HK$37.50 per hour.

India

India has among the most complicated minimum wage laws, with over 1200 minimum wages across the country, depending on the regional level of villages, tehsils, towns and cities and their individual expenses. For example, Mumbai has a minimum wage of Rs. 348/month (as of 2017) while the minimum wages in Nashik and villages in Bihar are far lesser. However, the law is rarely implemented at the ground level, even for contract labourers for government projects and works.In Mumbai, as of 2017, the minimum wage was Rs. 348/day.

Ireland

The minimum wage was introduced in Ireland in 2000 at IR£4.40 (€5.59) per hour, and as of 1 January 2018, it is €9.55 per hour. This is subject to reduction as follows:

30% reduction for all employees under 18.
20% reduction for employees over 18 in their first year of employment in any job since they turned 18.
10% reduction for employees over 18 in their second year of employment in any job since they turned 18.

It may further be reduced by up to €7.73 a day if lodgings and/or food are provided as part of a job.

Trainees (including those over 18) are also entitled to different minimum wages, reduced as follows:

25% reduction for the time during the first one-third of the course.
20% reduction for the time during the second one-third of the course.
10% reduction for the time during the final one-third of the course.

Ireland's minimum wage prior to the €1 cut in the 2011 budget, was only fifth highest of eight EU countries surveyed for the British Low-Pay Commission Report in 2010, with the UK, Netherlands, France and Belgium all listed as having higher minimum wage rates when OECD Comparative Price Levels are taken into account.

Japan

New Zealand
New Zealand was the first country to implement a national minimum wage, enacted by its government through the Industrial Conciliation and Arbitration Act 1894.
Current minimum wage law is described in the Minimum Wage Act 1983.  The Minimum Wage (New Entrants) Amendment Act 2007 provided that the rates for 16- to 17-year-olds and those in training cannot be lower than 80% of the adult rate.

Application of gendered wage rates
From 1 April 1946 to 31 March 1977, there were separate minimum wage rates for men and women in New Zealand. From 1 April 1977, New Zealand abolished these gendered minimum wages, instead having one minimum wage for all adults.

Application of youth and adult rates
From 5 March 2001, the minimum youth rate (now known as the Starting Out rate) applied only to workers aged 16 or 17-years-old. From 31 March 1994 to 4 March 2001, the minimum youth rate applied to workers aged 16, 17, 18 or 19-years-old. Before 31 March 1994, there was no minimum wage for workers under the age of 20. As such, the adult minimum wage has applied to workers aged 18 and older since 5 March 2001. Before that, it applied to workers aged 20 and older.

Current rates
As at 1 April 2020, the current minimum wage rates in New Zealand are:

Historical rates

1946 to 1967
Note: Until 10 July 1967, New Zealand's currency was the New Zealand pound, a non decimal currency denoted in pounds (£), shillings (s.) and pence (d.)

1967 to 1977

1977 to present

Pakistan
Monthly minimum wages in Pakistan are recommended by the Federal Government under nationally applicable Labour Policies and set by Provincial Minimum Wages Boards under the Minimum Wages Ordinance, 1961.

Pakistan's first minimum wage was introduced in 1992 when it was set at PKR 1,500 (~US$45) per month.

It was, subsequently, raised:

in 1996 to PKR 1,650 (~US$45.83) per month
in 1998 to PKR 1,950 (~US$40.12) per month
in 2001 to PKR 2,500 (~US$ $40.90) per month 
 
in 2003 to PKR 3,000 (~US$ $54.15) per month 
in 2004 to PKR 4,000 (~US$ $69.32) per month 
in 2007 to PKR 4,600 (~US$ $75.78) per month
in 2008 to PKR 6,000 (~US$ $85.42) per month
in 2010 to PKR 7,000 (~US$ $83.83) per month
in 2012 to PKR 8,000 (~US$ $86.39) per month
in 2013 to PKR 10,000 (~US$ $102.56) per month
in 2014 to PKR 12,000 (~US$ $124.10) per month

(USD equivalents are calculated using the average annual exchange rate in the respective year)

Romania

Two minimum wage levels are enforced in Romania. For state employees, the level is set by law at 600 RON (~US$200). For all other employees, the wage is set at 440RON (~US$145) by collective bargaining, which also stipulates multiplication indices for various levels of education. Jobs that require high-school and college qualifications are paid at least 1.5 and 2 times the minimum wage, respectively. Teachers' unions resorted to justice to claim same treatment and be paid according to collective bargaining. As of November 2007, they won three landmark cases and expect similar decisions in several dozens other courts. A single, unified level was proposed starting 1 January 2008 but it failed.

Taiwan 

The Taiwanese government does not have a set minimum wage, but a basic wage in its Labor Standards Law serves the minimum wage function. The basic wage set per month is NT$25,250, NT$168 per hour, effective July 1, 2022.

United Kingdom

Municipal regulation of wage levels began in some towns in 1524.

Wages Councils
The Trade Boards Act 1909 created four Trades Boards that set minimum wages which varied between industries for a number of sectors where "sweating"  was generally regarded as a problem and where collective bargaining was not well established. This system was extended considerably after the Second World War; in 1945 Trades Boards became Wages Councils, which set minimum wage standards in many sectors of the economy, including the service sector as well as manufacturing. Wages Councils were finally abolished in 1993, having fallen into decline due, in large part, to Trades Union opposition. A lower limit of pay, or "pay floor" was regarded as threatening the voluntary system of collective bargaining favoured in the UK. The government had first made a serious attempt to abolish Wages Councils in 1986, having abandoned existing legislation that tried to widen the scope of voluntary agreements to include those firms that had not taken part in negotiations, such as the Fair Wages Resolutions. These required that government contractors pay fair wages and respect the rights of their employees to be members of trades unions.

Instead the Wages Act 1986 reformed the wages councils and abolished the power to create new ones.

National Minimum Wage
A National Minimum Wage (NMW) was introduced for the first time by the Labour government on 1 April 1999 at the rate of £3.60 per hour for those workers aged 22 and over, Labour having promised to set a minimum wage in their 1997 general election campaign. In its election manifesto, it had said that every other modern industrial country had already adopted a minimum wage.

This rate was set after the Low Pay Commission (LPC), an independent body the government appointed in July 1997 to advise it on low pay, recommended the rate. The LPC's permanent status was later confirmed and it continues to make recommendations to government on the NMW, which has been uprated in October every year since 2000. The LPC board consists of nine members—three trade unionists, three employers, and three labour market relations experts. The Commission undertakes consultations each year to gather available evidence before making recommendations in its biennial review.

The current minimum wage in the UK, as of April 2021 is £8.91 per hour for workers aged 23 and above, £8.36 for workers aged 21–22, £6.56 for workers aged 18–20, £4.62 for workers under 18, and £4.30 for apprentices aged 16–18 and those aged 19 or over who are in their first year.

Some workers undertaking apprenticeships or accredited training may be exempted (that is, not considered eligible to receive the NMW) for a certain period of time, which varies according to their age and the length of time in employment. Other categories of worker who are exempt include au pairs, share fishermen, clergy, those in the Armed Forces, prisoners and some people working in family businesses. The rate payable under the NMW can, in all cases, also be reduced where accommodation is provided to the worker.

Unlike most other employment rights legislation in the UK, which generally rely on affected individuals raising grievances and making claims, if necessary, before tribunals to enforce these rights, the NMW has compliance teams, attached to Her Majesty's Revenue and Customs (HMRC) offices who will act on approaches from workers who think they are being paid less than the minimum wage by contacting and visiting their employers. Affected workers can either make a complaint directly to a national helpline or seek advice from another agencies such as their local Citizens Advice Bureau or the Scottish Low Pay Unit—this is particularly recommended if other employment rights issues are involved, as the HMRC can only deal with minimum wage enquiries.

National Living Wage
From 1 April 2016 a National Living Wage was introduced for workers over 25, implemented at a significantly higher minimum wage rate. It was expected to rise to at least £9 per hour by 2020, although the actual figure set for April 2020 is £8.72.

United States

In the United States, statutory minimum wages were first introduced nationally in 1938.

The Fair Minimum Wage Act of 2007 is the current federal minimum wage law of the United States.  It was signed into law on May 25, 2007 as a rider to the U.S. Troop Readiness, Veterans' Care, Katrina Recovery, and Iraq Accountability Appropriations Act, 2007.  The act implemented three increases to the federal minimum wage—from $5.15 an hour to $5.85 per hour on July 24, 2007, to $6.55 per hour on July 24, 2008, and to $7.25 an hour on July 24, 2009.

Nearly all states within the United States have minimum wage laws; Alabama, Louisiana, Mississippi, South Carolina, and Tennessee are the only states yet to set a minimum wage law.

As of July 24, 2009, U.S. federal law requires a minimum wage of at least $7.25 per hour. In 2011 5.2% of all hourly-paid workers age 16 or over earned an hourly wage at or below the federal minimum wage. 

According to the Economic Policy Institute, the minimum wage in the United States would have been $18.28 in 2013 if the minimum wage kept pace with labor productivity. To adjust for increased rates of worker productivity in the United States, raising the minimum wage to $22 (or more) an hour has been presented.

International Labour Organization
International Labour Organization insists "minimum wage fixing" for rights of labours and has adopted Minimum Wage-Fixing Machinery Convention, 1928, Minimum Wage Fixing Machinery (Agriculture) Convention, 1951 and Minimum Wage Fixing Convention, 1970 following up these former Conventions.

See also

 Average worker's wage
 Economic inequality
 Fair Labor Standards Act
 List of minimum wages by country
 List of U.S. minimum wages
 Living wage
 Maximum wage
 Minimum wage
 Minimum Wage Fixing Convention, 1970
 Minimum wage in the United States
 United States labor law
 Wage slavery
 Working poor

References 

 
Minimum wage
Lists by country